Stanley Michels was a politician and member of the Democratic Party who was elected to the New York City Council and served from years 1978 to 2001.

Early life
Stanley Ernest Michels was born in Manhattan on January 28, 1933. He was the son of Lewis and Anne Strasberg Michels. His parents owned a handbag factory. He has a sister named Ellen Grant.

Mr. Michels graduated from Hobart College in 1955 and received a law degree from Cornell in 1958. He then served in the Army Judge Advocate General's Corps. While in private law practice in New York, he was also a legal counsel to the State Department of Taxation and Finance.

Mr. Michels married Molly Sokoloff in the year 1960. They have a son named Jeffrey. They have two daughters named Karen Michels and Shari R. Michels. Shari is a New York Civil Court judge. Stanley has three grandchildren.

New York City Council

Councilman Michels was elected to the City Council in 1978. He represented a district in northern Manhattan. He created legislation that mostly focused on reducing pollution and other environmental issues in New York City, like reducing and limiting the use of cigarette smoking indoors and protecting children from lead paint poisoning.

Councilman Michels was the prime sponsor of the Clean Indoor Air Act, which was the city's first law regulating smoking in public places. It required that nonsmoking areas be established in all enclosed public spaces designed to accommodate more than 10 people. It was introduced to the New York CIty Council in the year 1987.

That law was expanded by two subsequent laws, including the complete ban on smoking in bars and restaurants adopted in 2003 at the urging of Mayor Michael R. Bloomberg.

Passing
Stanley passed away in 2008 at the age of 75 from cancer. A promenade in Fort Tryon Park in northern Manhattan is named in his honor.

References

1933 births

2008 deaths
New York City Council members